Who Do You Think You Are? is an American genealogy documentary series that is an adaptation of the British series of the same name that airs on the BBC. In each episode, a celebrity participant researches their family history. The participant often travels to locations both domestically and internationally to research family stories.

The series is a partnership between Shed Media, NBC Entertainment and Ancestry.com with executive producers including Alex Graham, Pam Healey, Lisa Kudrow, Dan Bucatinsky, Stephanie Schwam and Al Edgington.

The show premiered on March 5, 2010, on NBC, where it ran for three seasons before being cancelled in 2012. It was then picked up by TLC, where it aired for seven additional seasons. The series was renewed for a tenth season, which premiered on December 3, 2018, and featured Mandy Moore, Regina King, Josh Duhamel and Matthew Morrison.

On May 6, 2019, it was announced that the series would return to NBC. The show premiered on July 10, 2022, and the season featured guests including Allison Janney, Zachary Levi, Nick Offerman and Bradley Whitford. On October 10, 2022, it was reported that NBC shelved the series indefinitely.

Production
In early 2009, it was announced that NBC had ordered an American adaptation of the British series Who Do You Think You Are?. It was reported that Lisa Kudrow was set to executive produce the series as well as participate in one of the first-season episodes. The show premiered on NBC on March 5, 2010, as one of the replacement shows for The Jay Leno Show at the ten o'clock hour.

NBC renewed the series for two subsequent seasons before cancelling it in 2012. The series was then picked up by TLC, where it aired for six additional seasons. On August 25, 2017, TLC renewed the series for a tenth season.

Series overview

Episodes

Season 1 (2010)

Season 2 (2011)
NBC ordered a second season for the reality series on April 5, 2010. The second season of the series began on February 4, 2011, and consisted of eight episodes. The first episode featured Vanessa Williams. Following episodes featured Tim McGraw, Rosie O'Donnell, Kim Cattrall, Lionel Richie, Steve Buscemi, Gwyneth Paltrow and Ashley Judd. Cattrall's episode is an edited version of the original one that she made for the British series in 2009.

Season 3 (2012)
The show was renewed for a third season by NBC on February 22, 2011, and aired during the 2011–2012 television season. The 12 celebrities included in season 3 were Marisa Tomei, Rob Lowe, Paula Deen, Rashida Jones, Jerome Bettis, Reba McEntire, Helen Hunt, Edie Falco, Rita Wilson, Jason Sudeikis, Martin Sheen and Blair Underwood. The show returned on February 3, 2012.

Season 4 (2013)
After being cancelled by NBC, TLC picked up the series and the new season began on July 23, 2013. The celebrities taking part in the fourth season were Christina Applegate, Cindy Crawford, Zooey Deschanel, Chelsea Handler, Kelly Clarkson, Trisha Yearwood, Jim Parsons and Chris O'Donnell.

Season 5 (2014–15)
TLC renewed the show on September 10, 2013. The season premiered on July 23, 2014, and featured Cynthia Nixon, Jesse Tyler Ferguson, Rachel McAdams, Valerie Bertinelli and Kelsey Grammer. Initially, an episode featuring Lauren Graham was planned but cancelled. Just like Kim Cattrall's episode, the network chose to air an edited version of an episode that Minnie Driver had made for the original BBC series in 2013.

Season 6 (2015)
Season 6 premiered on July 26, 2015. This season featured Ginnifer Goodwin,  J. K. Rowling, Alfre Woodard, Bryan Cranston and Tom Bergeron. Rowling's episode was an edited version of her appearance on the original BBC series in 2011.

Season 7 (2016)
Season 7 premiered on April 3, 2016. The list of celebrity participants included Aisha Tyler, Scott Foley, Lea Michele, Chris Noth, Katey Sagal and Molly Ringwald.

Season 8 (2017)
On June 9, 2016, the series was renewed for an eighth season consisting of 8 episodes which premiered on March 5, 2017. The list of celebrities that participated included Jessica Biel, Julie Bowen, Courteney Cox, Jennifer Grey, Smokey Robinson, John Stamos,  Liv Tyler and Noah Wyle.

Season 9 (2018)
The series was renewed for a ninth season that premiered on May 21, 2018. The list of celebrity participants included Hilary Duff, Jean Smart, Jon Cryer, Laverne Cox, Megan Mullally and Molly Shannon.

Season 10 (2018)
The tenth season premiered on December 3, 2018. The list of celebrity participants included Mandy Moore, Regina King, Josh Duhamel and Matthew Morrison.

Season 11 (2022)

Reception

Awards and nominations

Ratings

Season 1: 2010

Season 2: 2011

Season 3: 2012

Season 4: 2013

Season 5: 2014–15

Season 6: 2015

Season 7: 2016

Season 8: 2017

Season 9: 2018

Season 10: 2018

Season 11: 2022

DVD releases

International distribution
In Australia, season 1 began airing on the Nine Network on April 28, 2010. Season 2 and reruns of season 1 will now air on sister channel, GEM. For a reason unexplained by Nine, the episodes featuring Spike Lee and Emmitt Smith were not aired in initial Australian screenings.
In the Republic of Ireland, the first season of the US version began airing on RTÉ One on Thursday, May 27, 2010, at 22:25. The second series premiered on RTÉ One on Monday, July 4, 2011, at 22:40.
In the United Kingdom, the first season of the US version began airing on BBC One on Sunday, June 13, 2010, at 21:15. The show received the same voice-over as the UK original series. The second series, premiered on Wednesday, November 16, 2011, at 22:45. The first episode shown was that following Steve Buscemi.  The fourth series premiered on BBC1 at midnight on Tuesday, January 14, 2014. The order of celebrity is changed in the opening credits to Applegate, Clarkson, O'Donnell, Deschanel, Crawford and Parsons.  Handler and Yearwood are not featured as they have little profile in the UK.
In Sweden, the first season of the US version began airing with Swedish subtitles on SVT on Tuesday, September 14, 2010, at 13:20.
In Greece, the first season of the US version began airing with Greek subtitles on Fox Life on Thursday, October 14, 2010, at 21:55.
In Finland, the first season of the US version began airing with Finnish subtitles on MTV3 on Thursday December 30, 2010, at 20:00, called Sukujuuria etsimässä, "Looking for family roots".
In Czech Republic, Slovakia, Hungary and Former Yugoslav republics, the US version airs on Universal Channel, the British version airs on Viasat History.
In Romania, both versions began airing on January 1, 2019, only on Național 24 Plus.
In The Netherlands, the US versions of season 1 and 2 aired on August 8, 2013.
 In Italy, the show began airing on Studio Universal on February 4, 2013. Reruns of season 2 and season 1 began airing on LaEFFE since May 2013.
 In Germany, it began airing on RTL Living on November 25, 2011. The network also aired the British version of the series on January 6, 2012.

See also
 African American Lives
 Ancestors in the Attic
 Finding Your Roots
 Genealogy Roadshow

Notes

References

External links
 (NBC)
 (TLC)

2010s American documentary television series
2010 American television series debuts
2012 American television series endings
2013 American television series debuts
2018 American television series endings
2020s American documentary television series
2022 American television series debuts
American genealogy
American television series based on British television series
American television series revived after cancellation
English-language television shows
NBC original programming
TLC (TV network) original programming
Television series about family history
Television series by Warner Bros. Television Studios